Bart Van Zundert (born 30 November 1980) is a Belgian former professional footballer who played as a defender.

References

External links
 Profile - Antwerp
 

1980 births
Living people
Belgian footballers
Association football defenders
Beerschot A.C. players
K.F.C. Verbroedering Geel players
K.V. Mechelen players
S.V. Zulte Waregem players
F.C.V. Dender E.H. players
Royal Antwerp F.C. players
Royal Cappellen F.C. players